Datuk Snowdan anak Donald Lawan (born 5 September 1971) is a Malaysian politician from the Parti Rakyat Sarawak (PRS), a component party of the ruling Gabungan Parti Sarawak (GPS) coalition who has served as the State Deputy Minister of Tourism, Creative Industry and Performing Arts of Sarawak in charge of Creative Industry and Performing Arts in the GPS state administration under Premier Abang Abdul Rahman Johari Abang Openg and Minister Abdul Karim Rahman Hamzah since January 2022 and Member of the Sarawak State Legislative Assembly (MLA) for Balai Ringin since May 2006. He served as State Deputy Minister of Youth and Sports of Sarawak in the GPS  and Barisan Nasional (BN) state administrations under Premier Abang Johari and Minister Abdul Karim from May 2017 to December 2021. He has also served as Youth Chief of PRS since October 2016.

Election results

Honours
  :
  Member of the Order of the Defender of the Realm (AMN) (2010)
  :
  Commander of the Order of the Star of Hornbill Sarawak (PGBK) – Datuk (2017)

See also
 Balai Ringin (state constituency)

References

Living people
1971 births
21st-century Malaysian politicians
Parti Rakyat Sarawak politicians
Members of the Sarawak State Legislative Assembly
Members of the Order of the Defender of the Realm
Commanders of the Order of the Star of Hornbill Sarawak
People from Sarawak